Wayna Chullunkhäni (Aymara wayna young, chullunkhä ('ä' stands for a long 'a') icicle, -ni a suffix to indicate ownership, meaning "Young Chullunkhäni" or literally "the young one with icicles", Hispanicized spelling Huayna Chulluncani, also Huayna Chullcani) is a  mountain in the Cordillera Occidental in the Andes of Bolivia. It is located in the Oruro Department, Sajama Province, Turco Municipality.

The name of this mountain - where wayna is sometimes used in the Andes region as an attribute for a neighboring lower mountain - might refer to the Chullkani volcano west of it which possibly erroneously received that name instead of 'Chullunkhäni'.

References 

Mountains of Oruro Department